Verron may refer to:
Verron (commune) a former commune in the French department of Sarthe
Verron range, one of the main mountain ranges in New Ireland
One of the synonyms of red French wine Fer